Lirceus is a genus of isopod crustaceans in the family Asellidae that live in southern Canada and the eastern United States as far west as the Great Plains. Of the 15 species in the genus, two are listed as either endangered (EN) or vulnerable (VU) on the IUCN Red List.
Lirceus alabamae Hubricht & Mackin, 1949 – Alabama
Lirceus bicuspidatus Hubricht & Mackin, 1949 – Arkansas
Lirceus bidentatus Hubricht & Mackin, 1949 – Arkansas
Lirceus brachyurus (Harger, 1876) – Pennsylvania, Virginia, West Virginia
Lirceus culveri Estes & Holsinger, 1976 – Virginia  
Lirceus fontinalis Rafinesque-Schmaltz, 1820 – Ohio, Indiana, Illinois, Kentucky, Tennessee
Lirceus garmani Hubricht & Mackin, 1949 – Missouri, Arkansas, Kansas, Oklahoma
Lirceus hargeri Hubricht & Mackin, 1949 – Tennessee, Virginia
Lirceus hoppinae (Faxon, 1889) – Missouri, Arkansas, Oklahoma
Lirceus lineatus (Say, 1818) – Canada, eastern United States
Lirceus louisianae (Mackin & Hubricht, 1938) – Illinois, Missouri, Arkansas, Louisiana
Lirceus megapodus Hubricht & Mackin, 1949 – Missouri
Lirceus richardsonae Hubricht & Mackin, 1949 – Ohio
Lirceus trilobus Hubricht & Mackin, 1949 – Oklahoma
Lirceus usdagalun Holsinger & Bowman, 1973 – Virginia

References

Asellota
Freshwater crustaceans of North America
Crustaceans of the United States
Taxa named by Constantine Samuel Rafinesque
Taxonomy articles created by Polbot